Pobiedziska  is a town in Poznań County, Poland, with 8,209 inhabitants as of the year 2004. It is also the seat of the administrative district (gmina) called Gmina Pobiedziska.

The town's name comes from the word pobieda meaning victory. It was named by Casimir I the Restorer in 1048 AD, possibly to commemorate his defeat of Masław, a rebellious Masovian namiestnik.

In 1257, Pobiedziska was granted town privileges by Przemysł I of Greater Poland, making the town independent from the Ostrów Lednicki castellany. In 1331, the town was destroyed by the Teutonic Knights and it took many years to recover.

The town was often visited by Władysław Jagiełło. In 1423 he funded the construction of a Church of the Holy Spirit as well as a hospital for the poor.

Due to the partitions of Poland, the town fell under German control in the late 18th century. On December 29, 1918, the inhabitants of Pobiedziska took control of the town from German officials and disarmed the police and settlers. On January 4, 1919, Poles from Pobiedziska formed a 400-strong battalion which fought in the Greater Poland Uprising (1918–1919), including the battle for Inowrocław.

Sport

Pobiedziska is home to the football team Huragan Pobiedziska.

Notable residents
 Andrzej Pieczyński (born 1956), actor
 Antoni Palluth (1900-1944), cryptographer and engineer
 Antoni Świadek (1909-1945), priest and martyr
 Jarosław Molenda (born 1965), writer
 Wacław Strażewicz (born 1952), politician
 Willy Kaiser (1912–1986), German boxer, Olympic Gold medal 1936

References 

Cities and towns in Greater Poland Voivodeship
Poznań County